The Nightmare Continues E.P. is a promotional EP by the German punk band Die Toten Hosen for the cover album Learning English, Lesson One. It includes four songs from the album.

Track listing CD

 "Do Anything You Wanna Do" − 4:27 (Eddie and the Hot Rods)
 "Blitzkrieg Bop" − 1:50 (Ramones)
 "If the Kids Are United" − 3:08 (Sham 69)
 "Baby Baby" − 3:13 (The Vibrators)

Track listing 10 Zoll
 "Do Anything You Wanna Do" − 4:27 (Eddie and the Hot Rods)
 "Whole Wide World"
 "If the Kids Are United" − 3:08 (Sham 69)
 "Baby Baby" − 3:13 (The Vibrators)

Track listing 7 Zoll
 "Do Anything You Wanna Do" − 4:27 (Eddie and the Hot Rods)
 "Blitzkrieg Bop" − 1:50 (Ramones)
 "If the Kids Are United" − 3:08 (Sham 69)
 "Baby Baby" − 3:13 (The Vibrators)

Personnel
Campino - vocals
Andreas von Holst - guitar
Michael Breitkopf - guitar
Andreas Meurer - bass
Wolfgang Rohde - drums

1991 EPs
Covers EPs
Die Toten Hosen EPs